Craig B. Chandler is a Canadian businessman, lobbyist, and political activist. He is co-founder and CEO of the Progressive Group for Independent Business (PGIB). He was a candidate at the federal 2003 Progressive Conservative leadership convention, a candidate for Member of Parliament in Ontario, candidate for Member of the Legislative Assembly in Alberta, and candidate for Ward 12 City Councillor in Calgary, Alberta.

Political career

Early political experience
As an undergraduate at McMaster University in Hamilton, Ontario in the late 1980s, Chandler joined the Reform Party of Canada, where he was active as an organizer and fund-raiser. In the 1993 federal election, Chandler ran as a Reform Party candidate in the riding of Hamilton Mountain, at the age of 23 finishing in a distant second place with 10,297 votes, behind Liberal incumbent Beth Phinney, who received 27,218.

Chandler moved to Alberta in 1995. He ran in the 1997 provincial election as a candidate for the Social Credit Party of Alberta in the riding of Calgary West, finishing with 1,100 votes, or 7.5% of the electorate.

In 2000, Chandler's Progressive Group for Independent Business (PGIB) supported the creation of the Canadian Alliance. In 2002, Chandler and the PGIB backed Stephen Harper's successful bid for the leadership of the Alliance.

Federal politics
In 2003, Chandler joined the Progressive Conservative Party and became a candidate for the party's leadership, running on a platform of creating a coalition between the PC and Alliance party caucuses. He withdrew prior to voting and endorsed Calgary lawyer Jim Prentice, who also supported cooperation between the parties.

At the end of his speech Chandler was complimentary of the leadership qualities of his competitors David Orchard and Scott Brison, before endorsing and pledging support to Calgary lawyer Jim Prentice's leadership bid to the astonishment of many delegates in attendance.

Chandler admitted in The Globe and Mail and the National Post (May 29, 2003) that he had never tried to seriously contest the leadership of the PC Party, but had instead served as a voice for the Progressive Group for Independent Business (PGIB) and their United Alternative efforts.  PGIB donated $250,000 to Chandler's bid.

Alberta provincial politics

In the fall of 2007, Chandler sought the Progressive Conservative Association of Alberta (PCAA) nomination of Calgary-Egmont for the up-coming Alberta provincial election. Soon after winning the contest with a massive majority, Premier Stelmach and the PCAA Executive reviewed Chandler's candidacy. The concern was Chandler's association with a Christian organization with traditional views on marriage at the time this debate was occurring. Premier Ed Stelmach rejected Chandler as a candidate for the PC Party of Alberta.

In the 2008 Alberta election held on March 3, Chandler ran as an independent candidate in the Calgary-Egmont riding against Jonathan Denis, his replacement as the Tory candidate, and Liberal Cathie Williams. Chandler was widely expected to run as a candidate for the new Wildrose Alliance Party of Alberta but was defeated in his attempt to win election to the new party's board of directors. In the provincial election Chandler finished in third place with 2008 votes (16.2%), well behind Cathie Williams, the Liberal Party candidate, with 3289 votes (26.5%). The Progressive Conservative candidate (Jonathan Denis) won with 43.6% of the vote (5415 votes)."

Campaign management
Chandler claims to have managed 48 campaigns, presumably nominations, leadership races, municipal, provincial and federal elections.

In November 2004 during the 2004 Alberta election, Craig Chandler managed the campaign of David Crutcher, an Alberta Alliance Party candidate in Calgary-Egmont. Crutcher was not elected, winning 1,657 votes, or 14% of the total. Notably, David Crutcher received more votes than any other Alliance candidate in an urban riding. In 2005, David Crutcher ran for the leadership of the Alberta Alliance and Chandler managed his leadership campaign. Crutcher placed third out of four candidates. Chandler also managed the successful campaign of MLA Art Johnston.

He was also the campaign manager for Calgary Ward 14 winning alderman Peter Demong, and briefly served as his constituency assistant. Chandler also managed the third-place race of Jon Lord for the Conservative Party nomination in Calgary Centre and produced victories for Councilor Shane Keating, Peter Demong and Joe Magliocca in the 2013 Calgary civic election.

In 2020, Chandler worked on Dr. Leslyn Lewis' campaign for leader of the Conservative Party of Canada in which she was defeated.  According to Chandler's website he claimed to be the Western Chair for her campaign.  However, Steve Outhouse, the National Campaign Manager of Lewis's campaign refuted Chandler's claim that Chandler was Western Chair.  According to the Western Standard Outhouse stated "he [Chandler] only ran the call centre for Alberta and Saskatchewan and set up a couple meet and greets for her. And that was it."

In 2021, Chandler spearheaded the Take Back City Hall initiative to elect more small-c conservatives at the municipal level in Calgary, Alberta. The initiative recruited candidates and managed their campaigns in a few wards in Calgary with the Progressive Group for Independent Business (PGIB) as a vehicle. Almost all of the races ended in a loss for the Chandler backed candidates with Chandler, who ran himself in Ward 12, soundly defeated. Only a single candidate Dan McLean in Ward 13 achieved victory.

In 2022 Chandler again was employed by Dr. Leslyn Lewis to work on her second leadership campaign to be the leader of the Conservative Party of Canada.  However, in this second effort the results were lower than the first attempt where she garnered less than 10% of the vote losing to Pierre Poilievre on the first ballot.

In the media 
Told Albertans to Vote Conservative or Leave

In 2007 Chandler was on record stating that new Albertans had to vote for conservative parties, or they had to leave Alberta.  There was pushback from the PCAA that Chandler was dictating how people were to vote in an election and that only those votes that agreed with Chandler's views were acceptable.

Ann Coulter Speaking Tour

In 2010 Ezra Levant, CEO of Rebel News, organized a cross country speaking tour at various universities by American right wing pundit Ann Coulter.  Chandler attempted to pose as one of the organizers and as a result was banned from the events.  According to Levant "Chandler was not allowed to attend the reception because he misrepresented himself as an organizer in media interviews during the incident in Ottawa."  Coulter herself spoke on the matter about Chandler's misrepresentation saying “I was watching the local news, which was all hockey and Ann Coulter, and some nut came on claiming that he was the organizer behind my speech. [murmurs in background] OK, his name is Craig Chandler. I sent an e-mail to my bodyguard saying Craig Chandler is disinvited from the event in Calgary. He’s on TV claiming to be the organizer and denouncing me!” 

Racist Videos

In 2022, Chandler was featured in an online video deemed racist along with former Alberta Cabinet Minister Jonathan Denis.  The video clips showed him using offensive stereotypes of first nations.  In an interview Chandler stated he was pictured in one of the videos and that "Some comedy is not politically correct, but this is a private function of my close friends. The video was taken by a close friend, I thought," he said.  Chandler was working on Daniel Smith's leadership campaign when the videos came out and she fired Chandler over it.

Later Chandler changed his story claiming the videos were fake.  However, Hany Farid, an acknowledged expert in the area of deep fakes states "But the knowledge of how these things are made, how difficult it would be to make them, I think it's extremely unlikely that these are deepfakes."

References

Living people
Canadian Pentecostals
Progressive Conservative Party of Canada leadership candidates
Politicians from Hamilton, Ontario
Alberta Social Credit Party candidates in Alberta provincial elections
Independent candidates in Alberta provincial elections
Ontario candidates for Member of Parliament
Reform Party of Canada candidates in the 1993 Canadian federal election
Year of birth missing (living people)